The Maratha–Mysore Wars was a conflict in the 18th century India, between the Maratha Empire and the Kingdom of Mysore. Though initial hostilities between the sides started in 1770s, the last warfare began on February 1785 and ended in 1787.

Situation in the 18th century  

18th century saw a steady decline of once a dominant power on the whole subcontinent – Mughal Empire. Apart from the disastrous invasion by the Afsharid ruler of Iran, Nader Shah in 1739, Mughals were successfully contested by Maratha Empire. Meanwhile, the British East India Company was asserting its influence in India and was engaged in a series of wars with Mysore which eventually resulted in the region falling under Company rule.

Mysore wars with the British  

Mysore was a relatively small kingdom in the beginning of 1700s. However, able rulers such as Hyder Ali and Tipu Sultan transformed the kingdom and westernized the army that it soon turned into a military threat both to the British and Maratha Empire. Upon Haidar Ali’s death, Mysore covered 80,000 sq. miles and had a population of approximately 6 million. 

Starting from 1767, Kingdom of Mysore had overall had four major military confrontations (1767–69; 1780–84; 1790–92; and 1799).

About 1761, commander in chief of the state of Mysore, Hyder Ali proclaimed himself absolute ruler of the Kingdom and started military campaigns to expand the territory of the state. In 1766, the British East India Company joined forces with the local ruler of Hyderabad against Hyder Ali, but by 1769, the British were left alone in a war with Mysore Kingdom. In 1769 Hyder Ali made his way to Madras (location of the Company's government) and demanded a peace treaty.

Maratha-Mysore Wars 

Although clashes between the Mysore ruler Hyder Ali and Marathas had taken place occasionally before 1785, the actual warfare started in February 1785.

After the Second Anglo-Mysore War, the ruler of Mysore Tipu Sultan sought to keep offensive moves by the Marathas at bay. Marathas had established a military alliance with the ruler of Hyderabad with a common purpose of recovering territories both had lost to Mysore in previous conflicts. Much of the desired territory was subject to marches, countermarches, and sieges of fortified points. The Marathas also attempted to draw the British East India Company into the pending conflict, but a neutrality policy implemented by the new governor-general, Lord Charles Cornwallis made its participation impossible.

Major conflicts
Battle of Rutehalli Fort (1764)
Battle of Sira and Madgiri (1767)
Battle of Chinkurli (1771) 
Battle of Saunshi (1777) 
Siege of Nargund, February 1785
Siege of Badami, May 1786
Siege of Adoni, June 1786
Battle of Gajendragad, June 1786
Battle of Savanur, 10 October 1786
Siege of Bahadur Benda, January 1787

Outcome 
The Maratha-Mysore War ended after the final conflict during the siege of Bahadur Benda in January 1787, and later settled for peace with the kingdom of Mysore, to which Tipu Sultan obliged with the signing of the treaty of Gajendragad in April 1787. Tipu had to pay an annual tribute of 12 lakhs per year to the Marathas, thus ending hostilities with them, which allowed him to focus on his rivalry with the British.
The Battle of Gajendragadh was fought between the Marathas and Tipu Sultan from March 1786 to March 1787 in which Tipu Sultan was defeated by the Marathas. By the victory in this battle, the border of the Maratha territory extended till Tungabhadra river. 

Maratha-Mysore war ended in April 1787, following the finalizing of treaty of Gajendragad, as per which, Tipu Sultan of Mysore was obligated to pay 4.8 million rupees as a war cost to the Marathas, and an annual tribute of 1.2 million rupees. In addition to returning all the territory captured by Hyder Ali, Tipu also agreed to pay 4 year's arrears of the tribute, which Mysore owed to the Marathas, through Hyder Ali.

Tipu would release Kalopant and return Adoni, Kittur, and Nargund to their previous rulers. Badami would be ceded to the Marathas. Tipu would also pay an annual tribute of 12 lakhs per year to the Marathas. In return, Tipu would get all the places that they had captured in the war, including Gajendragarh and Dharwar. Tipu would also be addressed by the Marathas by an honorary title of "Nabob Tipu Sultan, Fateh Ali Khan".
In Fourth Anglo-Mysore War maratha empire presented its support to the East India Company.

Bibliography 

 Duff, James Grant. A history of the Mahrattas, Volume 2
 Kumar, Raj. Essays on modern India
 Sen, Sailendra Nath. Anglo-Maratha relations, 1785-96

References

Conflicts in 1786
Conflicts in 1787
1786 in India
1787 in India
Wars involving the Kingdom of Mysore